The Spanish National Cyclo-cross Championships are held annually to decide the cycling champions in the cyclo-cross discipline.

Men

U23

Junior

Women

References

National cyclo-cross championships
Cycle races in Spain
Cyclo-cross